
Rio Cobre Juvenile Correctional Centre was built to accommodate 120 male inmates. 

It is operated by the Department of Correctional Services for the Ministry of National Security.

See also

List of prisons in Jamaica

External links
Aerial view.
Photos:

References

Prisons in Jamaica
Buildings and structures in Saint Catherine Parish
Spanish Town